Dolichoderus epetreius is a species of ant in the genus Dolichoderus. Described by Lattke in 1987, the species is only known to be endemic to Venezuela.

References

Dolichoderus
Hymenoptera of South America
Insects described in 1987